tcsh ( “tee-see-shell”,  “tee-shell”, or as “tee see ess aitch”, tcsh) is a Unix shell based on and backward compatible with the C shell (csh).

Shell
It is essentially the C shell with programmable command-line completion, command-line editing, and a few other features. Unlike the other common shells, functions cannot be defined in a tcsh script and the user must use aliases instead (as in csh). It is the native root shell for BSD-based systems such as FreeBSD.

tcsh added filename and command completion and command line editing concepts borrowed from the TENEX operating system, which is the source of the “t”.  Because it only added functionality and did not change what was there, tcsh remained backward compatible with the original C shell.  Though it started as a side branch from the original csh source tree that Bill Joy had created, tcsh is now the main branch for ongoing development.

tcsh is very stable but new releases continue to appear roughly once a year, consisting mostly of minor bug fixes.

On many systems, such as macOS and Red Hat Linux, csh is actually tcsh.  Often one of the two files is either a hard link or a symbolic link to the other, so that either name refers to the same improved version of the C shell.

On Debian and some derivatives (including Ubuntu), there are two different packages: csh and tcsh. The former is based on the original BSD version of csh and the latter is the improved tcsh.

History
The “t” in tcsh comes from the “T” in TENEX, an operating system which inspired Ken Greer at Carnegie Mellon University, the author of tcsh, with its command-completion feature. Greer began working on his code to implement Tenex-style file name completion in September 1975, finally merging it into the C shell in December 1981.  Mike Ellis at Fairchild A.I. Labs added command completion in September 1983.  On October 3, 1983, Greer posted source to the net.sources newsgroup.

Significant features
Command history
The built-in history command displays the previously entered commands
Use of  /  at the command line to allow the user to select a command from the history to edit/execute
Invoking previous commands using command history
!! executes the previous command
!n executes the nth command that was previously executed
!-n executes the command that was executed n commands ago
!string executes the most recently executed command that starts with string
!?string executes the most recently executed command that contains string
Using history in new commands
!* - refers to all of the arguments from the previous command
!$ - refers to the last argument from the previous command
!^ - refers to the first argument from the previous command
!:n - refers to the nth argument from the previous command
!:m-n - refers to the mth through nth arguments from the previous command
!:n-$ - refers to the nth through the last argument from the previous command
Command line editing
Auto-completion of file names and variables as well as programmable completion at the command line
Alias argument selectors; the ability to define an alias to take arguments supplied to it and apply them to the commands that it refers to.  Tcsh is the only shell that provides this feature.
\!# - argument selector for all arguments, including the alias/command itself; arguments need not be supplied.
\!* - argument selector for all arguments, excluding the alias/command; arguments need not be supplied.
\!$ - argument selector for the last argument; argument need not be supplied, but if none is supplied, the alias name is considered to be the last argument.
\!^ - argument selector for first argument; argument MUST be supplied.
\!:n - argument selector for the nth argument; argument MUST be supplied; n=0 refers to the alias/command name.
\!:m-n - argument selector for the arguments from the mth to the nth; arguments MUST be supplied.
\!:n-$ - argument selector for the arguments from the nth to the last; at least argument n MUST be supplied.
\!:n* - argument selector for the arguments from the nth to the last; sufficient arguments need not be supplied.#Alias the cd command so that when you change directories, the contents are immediately displayed.
alias cd 'cd \!* && ls'
Wildcard matchingif ( "$input" =~ [0-9]* ) then
  echo "the input starts with an integer"
else
  echo "the input does NOT start with an integer"
endif
Job control
The built-in where command.  Works like the which command but shows all locations of the target command in the directories specified in $PATH rather than only the one that will be used.

Deployment
Early versions of Mac OS X shipped with tcsh as the default shell, but the default for new accounts became bash as of 10.3 then zsh as of 10.15. (tcsh is still provided, and upgrading the OS does not change the shell of any existing accounts). tcsh is the default root shell of FreeBSD (the default user shell is POSIX-based) and its descendants like DragonFly BSD and DesktopBSD.

See also

 Comparison of command shells

References

External links
 
 tcsh releases
 tcsh mailing list
 tcsh manual page
 Archive for the O'Reilly book "Using csh and tcsh"

Cross-platform free software
Free software programmed in C
Scripting languages
Software using the BSD license
Text-oriented programming languages
Unix shells